"Cold" is a song by American nu metal band Korn. It was released as a promotional single from their thirteenth studio album The Nothing.

Background
The song was released on August 2, 2019, coupled with a dedicated visualizer designed by Nicolas Fong, featuring confusing architecture coupled with depictions of lions and ghosts.

A live video was released in November.

Composition
Labelled as a "punishing anthem", the song has been considered "a more mainstream and hard rock style" than the previously released single You'll Never Find Me, and as "one of the band's more experimental offerings".

Reception
Cold was ranked 18th in Consequence of Sound's Top 30 Metal + Hard Rock Songs of 2019. It was also ranked 11th in Kerrang's ranking of The 20 greatest Korn songs.

A negative review of the song came from Axl Rosenberg of MetalSucks, who otherwise praised the visualizer, recommending readers "[put] the video on mute and [listen] to something else while you watch it".

Personnel
 Jonathan Davis – lead vocals
 James "Munky" Shaffer – guitars
 Brian "Head" Welch – guitars
 Reginald "Fieldy" Arvizu – bass
 Ray Luzier – drums

Charts

References

2019 songs
2019 singles
Korn songs
Songs written by Jonathan Davis
Songs written by James Shaffer
Songs written by Brian Welch
Songs written by Reginald Arvizu
Roadrunner Records singles
American hard rock songs
Avant-garde metal songs